Fuhn's five-toed skink (Leptosiaphos fuhni) is a species of lizard in the family Scincidae. It is found in Cameroon.

References

Leptosiaphos
Reptiles of Cameroon
Endemic fauna of Cameroon
Reptiles described in 1973
Taxa named by Jean-Luc Perret